Chrysoscota conjuncta is a moth of the family Erebidae. It was described by Walter Rothschild in 1912. It is found in Papua New Guinea. The habitat consists of mountainous and lowland areas.

References

Lithosiina
Moths described in 1912